This is a list of Kappa Sigma Grand Conclaves and Leadership Conferences.

Kappa Sigma is an international fraternity with currently over 400 active chapters and colonies in North America.  There have been more than 245,000 initiates, of which more than 188,000 are living and more than 12,900 are undergraduates. It is currently the leader of all American fraternities in terms of pledges and new initiates per year, service hours, and philanthropic donations. It has the oldest continuous endowment fund which has donated $4.5 million to undergrads since its inception in 1919.

Legend:

Notes

References 

Grand Conclaves
Lists of fraternity and sorority national conferences